Blepolenis is a Neotropical genus of butterflies in the family Nymphalidae and subfamily Morphinae.

Species
Blepolenis bassus (C. & R. Felder, [1867])
Blepolenis batea (Hübner, [1821])
Blepolenis catharinae (Stichel, 1902)

References

Morphinae
Nymphalidae of South America
Nymphalidae genera
Taxa named by Julius Röber